Operation Keystone Eagle was the withdrawal of the initial units of the 3rd Marine Division from South Vietnam and their redeployment to Okinawa, taking place from 29 June to 30 August 1969.

Background
Following from the policy of Vietnamization, U.S. President Richard Nixon sought to reduce U.S. forces in South Vietnam. After a visit to South Vietnam in March 1969, Secretary of Defense Melvin Laird recommended that planning begin for the withdrawal of 50-70,000 U.S. troops in 1969 with further withdrawals in 1970. MACV began planning for the withdrawal of 50,000 troops or approximately two Divisions plus support units in late 1969. In late May the Joint Chiefs of Staff presented Laird with a plan for the phased withdrawal of 244,000 of the total 549,000 U.S. personnel in South Vietnam with the withdrawal of 50,000 troops in late 1969 comprising one Marine Division and one Army Division. Laird forwarded the plan to Nixon in early June with the recommendation that 20-25,000 troops be withdrawn starting in July. MACV had determined that the first units to be withdrawn would be the 3rd Marine Division and the 9th Infantry Division. On 8 June, Nixon met South Vietnamese President Nguyễn Văn Thiệu on Midway Island and Nixon convinced Thiệu to accept the fact of U.S. force reductions, following the meeting Nixon announced the beginning of unilateral U.S. troop withdrawals.

The initial withdrawal named Operation Keystone Eagle was the withdrawal of one Regimental Landing Team, however the selected Regiment, the 9th Marine Regiment and its supporting units did not meet the 8388-man level mandated by MACV and so additional support and miscellaneous units were added to make up the numbers.

Operation

On 14 June the 9th Marine Regiment was notified of its redeployment. On 23 June after completing its involvement in Operation Utah Mesa, the 1st Battalion, 9th Marines stood down at Vandegrift Combat Base.

The Keystone Eagle redeployments took place as follows:

Aftermath
Operation Keystone Eagle concluded on 30 August 1969, it was immediately followed by Operation Keystone Cardinal.

1/9 Marines and 3/9 Marines would return to South Vietnam in April 1972 during the Easter Offensive and in April 1975 during Operation Frequent Wind.

References

Keystone Eagle
United States Marine Corps in the Vietnam War
Battles and operations of the Vietnam War in 1969
History of Quảng Nam province